The Last Dragon is a 1985 martial arts musical film.

The Last Dragon may also refer to:

Arts and literature
The Last Dragon (2004 film)
The Last Dragon (novel), a 2004 children's novel by Silvana De Mari
The Last Dragon (The Regime album), a 2013 album by The Regime
The Last Dragon Chronicles, a series of novels by Chris d'Lacey
Raya and the Last Dragon, a 2021 film
"The Last Dragon", the twelfth episode of Legend of the Dragon
"The Last Dragon", the thirty-second episode of Mysticons

Music
The Last Dragon (soundtrack), soundtrack to the 1985 film
Last Dragon, a 2015 album by Sisqó, or its title track
"Last Dragon", a 2016 song by Eric Prydz from Opus